The 2017 Caribbean Cup was the 19th and final edition of the Caribbean Cup, the biennial international men's football championship of the Caribbean region organized by the Caribbean Football Union (CFU).

The top four teams qualified for the 2017 CONCACAF Gold Cup, while the fifth-placed team advanced to a play-off against the fifth-placed team from the 2017 Copa Centroamericana for the final Gold Cup berth.

The host for the final round was expected to be announced in January 2016.

Martinique was announced as host on 25 January 2017, winning over bids of Curaçao and French Guiana. The draw for the semi-finals was also conducted on the same day at the CFU office in St. John's, Antigua and Barbuda.

Curaçao won their first and only title following a 2–1 win over Jamaica in the final.

Qualification

Qualified teams
Four teams qualified for the final tournament. All four teams also qualified for the 2017 CONCACAF Gold Cup.

Bold indicates that the corresponding team was hosting or co-hosting the event.
1. This is Curaçao's second appearance since the dissolution of the Netherlands Antilles, as its direct successor (with regards to membership in football associations), inheriting the former nation's FIFA membership and competitive record.
2. French Guiana and Martinique are not FIFA members, and so do not have a FIFA Ranking.

Venues
The matches are played at Stade Pierre-Aliker, Fort-de-France.

Squads

Knockout stage
If tied after 90 minutes, extra time was played, and if still tied after extra time, a penalty shoot-out was used to determine the winner.

Bracket

All times AST (UTC−4).

Semi-finals

Third-place playoff

Final

Goalscorers
2 goals

 Elson Hooi

1 goal

 Rangelo Janga
 Gevaro Nepomuceno
 Loïc Baal
 Sloan Privat
 Rosario Harriott
 Jermaine Johnson
 Yoann Arquin

Prize money

On 25 June 2017, it was announced that national associations would receive the following prize money amounts.

References

External links
Official site
Caribbean Cup – Men, CONCACAF.com
Caribbean Cup, CFUfootball.org

 
2017 CONCACAF Gold Cup
2016–17 in Caribbean football
2017
2017 in Martinique
June 2017 sports events in North America